Ingo Pohlmann (stage name Pohlmann.; * 18 May 1972 in Rheda-Wiedenbrück) is a German pop music singer.

Biography 
Pohlmann is a trained bricklayer. After he did his community service, he moved to Münster where he had first appearances. Later, he moved to Hamburg.

His first album "Zwischen Heimweh und Fernsucht" resulted from an association with the producers Jan Löchel, Henning Wehland and Christian Neander.

On 9 February 2007, he took part in the "Bundesvision Song Contest" of the German comedian Stefan Raab. He competed for the federal state North Rhine-Westphalia and came fifth.

Discography 
Albums:
 24 February 2006: "Zwischen Heimweh und Fernsucht"
 21 September 2007: "Fliegende Fische"
 17 September 2010: "König der Straßen"
 10 May 2013: "Nix ohne Grund"
 23 March 2017: "Weggefährten"

Singles
 23 June 2006: "Wenn jetzt Sommer wär"
 6 October 2006: "Der Junge ist verliebt"
 2 February 2007: "Mädchen und Rabauken"
 7 September 2007: Wenn es scheint, dass nichts gelingt
 2 June 2008: "Fliegende Fische"
 10 September 2010: "Für Dich"
 28 January 2011: "König der Straßen"
 3 June 2011: "Wenn sie lächelt EP"
 14 March 2013: "StarWars"

External links 

 Official Homepage
 Pohlmann at MySpace

1972 births
Living people
German pop singers
Participants in the Bundesvision Song Contest
People from Rheda-Wiedenbrück
21st-century German male singers